Lindsay Yeo is a New Zealand broadcaster who for some time had his own radio programme on Newstalk ZB, and continues to make regular relief appearances on the network.

Since retiring, he has set up his own radio station, broadcasting music in the Tasman region on 107.4 FM, now also live streaming on www.mixer.com/RADIYO

Biography
Yeo through much of the 1970s and 1980s was the breakfast host of the Wellington radio station 2ZB. It consistently was the number one rated Wellington breakfast radio programme until the late 1980s.  One of Yeo's creations was the children's character "Buzz O'Bumble" who appeared every day on the radio show, with his other friends "Belinda" the bee and "Wally Weta".  Little has been heard of these characters since the format of 2ZB changed to news/talk in the late 1990s, and his community-oriented breakfast show was replaced with news and interviews.

The character Belinda was Buzz's wife and they also had a family, Bimbo, Bonny and Bobo. The children were most often played by Lindsay's own family. Wally Weta also had stage friends, Super Spider, Dumb Dumb and Dimwit the clowns. The group toured doing shows around the country. Buzz was seen riding elephants in the Moscow Circus parade through Wellington streets. Riding 8' unicycles at the Stratford stockcar track. Later Lindsay developed Bumbleland which allowed character expansion and he introduced a family of elves once again played by his own family.

The theme song used was, "It's A Small World".

After the show ended, Yeo retired to Tasman.

References

Further reading and listening
Broadcasters Oral History 2004 - Lindsay Yeo (90 minute interview), Sound Archives, Radio New Zealand

New Zealand broadcasters
Living people
Year of birth missing (living people)